The Ely Limestone is a geologic formation in Nevada and Utah. It preserves fossils dating back to the Carboniferous period.

See also

 List of fossiliferous stratigraphic units in Utah
 Paleontology in Utah
 List of fossiliferous stratigraphic units in Nevada
 Paleontology in Nevada

References

Carboniferous geology of Nevada
Carboniferous geology of Utah
Limestone formations of the United States